Patulibacter americanus  is a Gram-positive, psychrotolerant and aerobic bacterium from the genus of Patulibacter which has been isolated from biological soil crusts from the Colorado Plateau in the United States.

References 

Actinomycetota
Bacteria described in 2009